The Margraviate of Moravia was one of the Lands of the Bohemian Crown within the Holy Roman Empire and then Austria-Hungary, existing from 1182 to 1918. It was officially administrated by a margrave in cooperation with a provincial diet. It was variously a de facto independent state, and also subject to the Duchy, later the Kingdom of Bohemia. It comprised the historical region called Moravia, which lies within the present-day Czech Republic.

Geography
The Margraviate lay east of Bohemia proper, with an area about half that region's size. In the north, the Sudeten Mountains, which extend to the Moravian Gate, formed the border with the Polish Duchy of Silesia, incorporated as a Bohemian crown land upon the 1335 Treaty of Trentschin. In the east and southeast, the western Carpathian Mountains separated it from present-day Slovakia. In the south, the winding Thaya River marked the border with the Duchy of Austria.

Moravians, usually considered a Czech people that speak Moravian dialects, made up the main part of the population. According to a 1910 Cisleithanian census, 27.6% identified themselves as German Moravians. These ethnic Germans would later be expelled after the Second World War. Other ethnic minority groups included Poles, Roma and Slovaks.

History

After the early medieval Great Moravian realm had been finally defeated by the Árpád princes of Hungary in 907, what is now Slovakia was incorporated as "Upper Hungary" (Felső-Magyarország), while adjacent Moravia passed under the authority of the Duchy of Bohemia. King Otto I of Germany officially granted it to Duke Boleslaus I in turn for his support against the Hungarian forces in the 955 Battle of Lechfeld. Temporarily ruled by King Bolesław I Chrobry of Poland from 999 until 1019, Moravia was re-conquered by Duke Oldřich of Bohemia and ultimately became a land of the Crown of Saint Wenceslas held by the Přemyslid dynasty.

In 1182, the Margraviate was created at the behest of Emperor Frederick Barbarossa by merger of the three Přemyslid appanage principalities of Brno, Olomouc and Znojmo, and given to Conrad II, the son of Prince Conrad of Znojmo. As heir apparent, the future King Ottokar II of Bohemia was appointed Moravian margave by his father Wenceslaus I in 1247. Along with Bohemia, Moravia was ruled by the House of Luxembourg from the extinction of the Přemyslid dynasty until 1437. Jobst, nephew of Emperor Charles IV inherited the Margraviate in 1375, ruled autonomously and was even elected King of the Romans in 1410. Shaken by the Hussite Wars, the Moravian nobles remained loyal supporters of the Luxembourg emperor Sigismund.

In 1469, Moravia was occupied by the Hungarian king Matthias Corvinus, who had allied with the Catholic nobility against the rule of George of Poděbrady and had himself elected rival king of Bohemia at Olomouc. The rivalry with King Vladislaus II was settled in the 1479 Peace of Olomouc, whereby Matthias renounced the royal title but retained the rule over the Moravian lands.

With the other lands of the Bohemian Crown, the Margraviate was incorporated into the Habsburg monarchy upon the death of King Louis II in the 1526 Battle of Mohács. Moravia was ruled as a crown land within the Austrian Empire from 1804 and within Cisleithanian Austria from 1867.

During the foundation of Czechoslovakia after World War I, the Margraviate was transformed into “Moravia Land”, later “Moravia-Silesia Land” in 1918. This autonomy was eliminated in 1949 by the communist government and has not been re-established since.

Government

The margrave held ultimate authority in Moravia, throughout the history of the margraviate. This meant that as its margraves became more foreign, so too did governance of the margraviate.

Moravia possessed a legislature, known as the Moravian Diet. The assembly has its origins in 1288, with the Colloquium generale, or curia generalis. This was a meeting of the upper nobility, knights, the Bishop of Olomouc, abbots and ambassadors from royal cities. These meetings gradually evolved into the diet.

The power of this diet waxed and waned throughout history. By the end of the margraviate, the diet was almost powerless. The diet consisted of three estates of the realm: the estate of upper nobility, the estate of the lower nobility, and the estate of prelates and burghers. With the February Patent of 1861, the diet was reformed into a more egalitarian body. It still retained the same structure, but the members changed. It consisted of assembly seats for landowners, city-dwellers, and rural farmers. This was retained until the diet was abolished after the fall of the Dual Monarchy.

Moravian eagle

The coat of arms of Moravia is charged with a crowned silver-red chequered eagle with golden claws and tongue. It first appeared in the seal of Margrave Přemysl (1209–1239), a younger son of King Ottokar I of Bohemia. After 1462, the Moravian eagle was gold-red chequered, but was never accepted by the Moravian assembly.

Administration

Until 1848
In the mid 14th century Emperor Charles IV, also King of Bohemia and Margrave of Moravia, established administrative divisions called kraje. These subdivisions were named for their capitals:
Brno
Jihlava
Olomouc
Přerov
Uherské Hradiště
Znojmo

After 1848

After the 1848 revolutions, the kraje were replaced by political districts, which were largely retained by the Czechoslovak administration after 1918:

Boskovice
Brno
Dačice
Hodonín
Holešov
Hranice na Moravě
Hustopeče
Jihlava
Kroměříž
Kyjov
Litovel
Mikulov
Místek
Moravská Třebová
Moravské Budějovice
Moravský Beroun
Moravský Krumlov
Nové Město na Moravě
Nový Jičín
Olomouc
Ostrava
Přerov
Prostějov
Rýmařov
Šternberk
Šumperk
Tišnov
Třebíč
Uherské Hradiště
Uherský Brod
Valašské Meziříčí
Velké Meziříčí
Vsetín
Vyškov
Zábřeh
Znojmo

Demographics 
The region experienced rapid population growth when it was part of Austria-Hungary. From 1890 to 1900 alone there was an increase of 7.1%. The population development from 1851 to 1900 was as follows:

Ethnicity 

In terms of ethnicity, the population was predominantly divided between Czechs and Germans. The German minority mostly lived on the borders with Lower Austria and Silesia, and in various language islands (around Brünn, Olmütz, Iglau and Zwittau), as well as in some larger cities. The ethnic distribution according to the census was as follows:

Population by district (1910)

Rulers of Moravia

 Part of Great Moravia (c.820-907)

Dukes of Moravia

Přemyslid dynasty

Margraves of Moravia

Přemyslid dynasty
Conrad II Otto 1182–1191
united with Bohemia 1189–1197
Vladislaus I Henry 1197–1222, second son of King Vladislaus II of Bohemia and Judith of Thuringia
Vladislaus II 1223–1227, son of King Ottokar I of Bohemia and Constance of Hungary
Přemysl 1227–1239, son of King Ottokar I of Bohemia and Constance of Hungary
Vladislaus III 1239–1247, son of King Wenceslaus I of Bohemia and Kunigunde of Hohenstaufen 
Ottokar II 1247–1278, son of King Wenceslaus I of Bohemia and Kunigunde of Hohenstaufen 
directly held by King Rudolph I of Germany 1278–1283
Wenceslaus II 1283–1305, son of King Ottokar II of Bohemia and Kunigunda of Halych 
Wenceslaus III 1305–1306, son of King Wenceslaus II of Bohemia and Judith of Habsburg

Various dynasties
Rudolf I of Habsburg 1306–1307, son of King Albert I of Germany and Elizabeth of Carinthia 
Henry of Carinthia 1307–1310, son of Duke Meinhard of Carinthia and Elisabeth of Bavaria

Luxembourgs
John 1310–1333, son of Emperor Henry VII and Margaret of Brabant
Charles 1333–1349, son of King John of Bohemia and Elizabeth 
John Henry 1349–1375, enfeoffed by his brother King Charles IV 
Jobst of Moravia 1375–1411, son of John Henry, with his brothers John Sobieslaus (until 1394) and Prokop (until 1405)
Sigismund 1419–1423, son of Emperor Charles IV and Elizabeth of Pomerania

Various dynasties
Albert V of Austria 1423–1439, son-in-law of Sigismund
Ladislaus the Posthumous 1440–1457, son of Albert and grandson of Sigismund
George of Poděbrady 1458–1468
Matthias Corvinus 1468–1490, second son of John Hunyadi und Erzsébet Szilágyi

Jagiellons
Vladislaus II 1490–1516, son of King Casimir IV Jagiellon of Poland and Elisabeth of Habsburg
Louis II 1516–1526, son of King Vladislaus II

Habsburgs
Ferdinand I 1527–1564, fourth child of Philip I and Joanna of Castile
Maximilian II 1564–1576, son of Emperor Ferdinand I and Anne of Bohemia and Hungary
Rudolf II 1576–1608, son of Emperor Maximilian II 
Matthias II 1608–1617, son of Emperor Maximilian II 
Under the united rule of the Bohemian kings from 1611 (see List of rulers of Bohemia).

References

External links

 
Kingdom of Bohemia
History of Moravia
Subdivisions of the Habsburg monarchy
Subdivisions of Austria-Hungary
Lands of the Empire of Austria (1867–1918)
Marches of the Holy Roman Empire
12th-century establishments in Bohemia
1180s establishments in the Holy Roman Empire
1182 establishments in Europe
1918 disestablishments in Austria-Hungary
1918 disestablishments in Europe
Lands of the Bohemian Crown
Former monarchies of Europe